Qiao Wei (Chinese: 乔巍; born 20 July 1987 in Luoyang) is a Chinese professional footballer who plays as a defender, most recently for Shenzhen.

Club career
In 2007,Qiao Wei started his professional footballer career with Henan Jianye in the Chinese Super League. He would eventually make his league debut for Henan on May 18, 2008 in a game against Qingdao Jonoon, coming on as a substitute for Wang Shouting in the 83rd minute. He would go on to establish himself as a regular within the team, however at the 2012 Chinese Super League season he was part of the squad that was relegated. While he was part of the squad that immediately won promotion back into the top tier he saw his playing time reduced the following season before being dropped to the reserves.  

On 9 July 2016, Qiao signed for China League One side Shenzhen. He would make his debut in a league game on 23 July 2016 against Wuhan Zall in a 2-0 defeat. After the game he would go on to establish himself as vital member of the team and would go on help the club gain promotion at the end of the end of the 2018 China League One campaign.

Career statistics
Statistics accurate as of match played 31 December 2020.

Honours

Club
Henan Jianye
China League One: 2013

References

External links
 

1987 births
Living people
Chinese footballers
Footballers from Henan
Henan Songshan Longmen F.C. players
Shenzhen F.C. players
Chinese Super League players
China League One players
Association football defenders